Luis Patiño may refer to:
Luis Patiño (tennis) (born 1993), Mexican tennis player
Luis Patiño (baseball) (born 1999), Colombian baseball player